ZozoLala was an independent comics information magazine about Dutch language comics culture, that was published between 1982 and 2011. It was distributed for free by some 60 comics and book shops in the Netherlands and Belgium. With a print run of 6,500 copies per issue, ZozoLala was one of the major publications on comix and visual culture in Europe.

See also
 List of magazines in Belgium

External links
 www.zozolala.com

Visual arts magazines
Magazines published in Belgium
Defunct magazines published in Belgium
Dutch comics
Dutch-language magazines
Magazines about comics
Magazines established in 1982
Magazines disestablished in 2011
1982 establishments in the Netherlands